Pina Piovani (20 March 1897 – 2 January 1955) was an Italian stage and film actress. She was married to the actor Giulio Battiferri.

Partial filmography

 Napule... e niente cchiù (1928) - Paquita - stella del varietá
 The Pirate's Dream (1940) - Una popolana
 La fanciulla di Portici (1940) - L'ostessa
 La zia smemorata (1940) - La cameriera di Clara
 Tosca (1941) - Angela (uncredited)
 Il signore a doppio petto (1941)
 Se non son matti non li vogliamo (1941) - La padrona della caffetteria
 Il leone di Damasco (1942)
 Street of the Five Moons (1942) - Anna
 Sleeping Beauty (1942) - Nunziata
 Una storia d'amore (1942) - La donna del sussudio
 The Peddler and the Lady (1943) - Una popolana ai mercanti generali (uncredited)
 T'amerò sempre (1943) - Emma, una partoriente (uncredited)
 Gran premio (1944)
 The Innkeeper (1944) - Lucrezia, la cameriera della locanda
 The Gates of Heaven (1945) - La zia del piccolo Claudio (uncredited)
 Two Anonymous Letters (1945) - Un'operaia della tipografia (uncredited)
 Notte di tempesta (1946)
 Last Love (1947) - La madre del tenente
 The White Primrose (1947)
 Fury (1947)
 Fatal Symphony (1947)
 Ritrovarsi (1947)
 L'ebreo errante (1948)
 Man with the Grey Glove (1948) - Amalia
 City of Pain (1949) - Una esule
 Monaca santa (1949) - Madre Superiora
 The Force of Destiny (1950) - Cameriera di Leonora
 Night Taxi (1950)
 A Dog's Life (1950) - (uncredited)
 Il nido di Falasco (1950)
 Love and Blood (1951)
 Shadows Over Naples (1951)
 Accidents to the Taxes!! (1951) - La guardiana del collegio 'Le Mimose'
 Cameriera bella presenza offresi... (1951) - La signora Marchetti (uncredited)
 Cops and Robbers (1951) - Donata Esposito
 A Thief in Paradise (1952)
 The Adventures of Mandrin (1952)
 In Olden Days (1952) - Lucia (segment "Idillio") (uncredited)
 Papà ti ricordo (1952)
 Non è vero... ma ci credo (1952) - The Clairvoyant
 Il tallone di Achille (1952) - Madre della Bambina
 Er fattaccio (1952) - Sora Emma
 Carne inquieta (1952)
 Jolanda la figlia del corsaro nero (1953) - Madre superiore
 Lulu (1953) - Mrs. Salvi
 Voice of Silence (1953) - Teresa Fabiani
 One of Those (1953)
 Naples Sings (1953) - Donna Carmela
 In amore si pecca in due (1954)
 Angels of Darkness (1954)
 Of Life and Love (1954)
 Woman of Rome (1954) - Madre di Adriana
 Prima di sera (1954) - Bancani's Mother-in-law
 Ho ritrovato mio figlio (1954) - La perpetua
 If You Won a Hundred Million (1954) - Portiera (segment "Il pensionato")
 Loving You Is My Sin (1954) - The Mother Superior
 It Takes Two to Sin in Love (1954)
 Gli orizzonti del sole (1955) - (final film role)

References

Bibliography
 Ennio Bìspuri. Totò: principe clown : tutti i film di Totò. Guida Editori, 1997.

External links

1897 births
1955 deaths
Italian film actresses
Italian stage actresses
Actresses from Rome